Katie Jacobs is an American television producer and director. Katie Jacobs runs the Heel & Toe Films production company with Paul Attanasio, which produced the Fox series House and Century City. Jacobs made her directorial debut on House, directing two episodes of the third season.

Katie and then husband Paul Attanasio both started Heel & Toe Films at Paramount Pictures on July 17, 1998.

Selected filmography as producer 
She was a producer in all films unless otherwise noted.

Film 

Miscellaneous crew

Television 

As director

References

External links 
 

American film producers
American television directors
American television producers
American women television producers
American women television directors
Living people
Place of birth missing (living people)
Year of birth missing (living people)
21st-century American women